250 prosent (250 percent) is a live album by Norwegian alternative rock group Kaizers Orchestra. Released exclusively on vinyl and as a digital download from various sites, the release features recordings of ten songs (with one bonus track on digital versions purchased in the iTunes Store), recorded at various concerts held during the tour for the band's fourth album, Maskineri, which lasted from February to May 2008.

The name of the album is a reference to the introduction of their organist, Helge Risa (who is seen on the cover), featured in live performances of "Kontroll på kontinentet". Risa is billed from Transylvania and is also called "Mr. 250 prosent".

Background 
To tie in with Kaizers Orchestra's upcoming tour of Europe in October and November 2008, the band wanted to release a new recording.  At the start of the Maskineri tour, the band purchased a machine that records straight from the audio mixing console and the band recorded every concert they held. The band announced 250 prosent, a collection of twelve recordings from various concerts. Their original plan was to include recordings of the band's three favorite songs from each of their four albums, Ompa til du dør, Evig pint, Maestro and Maskineri.  When the track list was released it was clear they had changed those plans.

The decision to release it as a vinyl was made by the band's frontman Janove Ottesen, who had recently grown fond of the aged medium. The band had also released the tracks "Apokalyps meg" and "Du og meg Lou" as a vinyl single earlier that year.

Track listing 
Lyrics for all songs are in the Norwegian language. Lyrics and music by Janove Ottesen, unless otherwise noted.

iTunes Digital Download

Vinyl version

Side one 
 "KGB"
 "Apokalyps meg"
 "Container"
 "Maestro"
 "Dieter Meyers Inst."k

Side two 
 "Maskineri"
 "Volvo i Mexico"
 "Enden av november"
 "Sigøynerblod"
 "170"

Personnel 
 Janove Ottesen – vocals
 Geir Zahl – guitar
 Terje Winterstø Røthing – guitar
 Øyvind Storesund – double bass
 Helge Risa – keys, marimba
 Rune Solheim – drums

References 

Kaizers Orchestra albums
2008 live albums